The 2018 Southland Conference women's soccer tournament, the postseason women's soccer tournament for the Southland Conference, was held from October 31–November 4, 2018. The seven-match tournament took place at the Lamar Soccer Complex in Beaumont, Texas. The eight-team single-elimination tournament consisted of three rounds based on seeding from regular season conference play.

Media and TV
Broadcast of the quarterfinal and semifinal rounds were on the Southland Conference Digital Network.  The championship game was broadcast on ESPN+

Bracket

Schedule

Quarterfinals

Semifinals

Final

Statistics

Goalscorers 

2 Goals
 Caity Acosta – Abilene Christian
 Christina Arteaga – Abilene Christian
 Shay Johnson – Abilene Christian
 Kateyln Termini – Stephen F. Austin

1 Goal
 Connie Awuku-Darkoh – Central Arkansas
 Camille Bassett – Central Arkansas
 Brittany Caserma – Northwestern State
 Christina Cutura – Southeastern Louisiana
 Gracie Hair – Central Arkansas
 Lauren Hargus – Central Arkansas
 Katie Jennings – Stephen F. Austin
 Madison Ledet – Lamar
 Anna Loftus – Lamar
 Hallie McCarroll – Northwestern State
 Keely Morrow – McNeese State
 Kelso Peskin – Lamar
 Chelsea Reedy – Abilene Christian
 Morgan Rowlow – Central Arkansas

Own Goals
 Lamar vs. Southeastern Louisiana
 Southeastern Louisiana vs. Lamar

Awards and honors
Source: 
Tournament MVP: Shay Johnson – Abilene ChristianAll-Tournament team:'''

 Caity Acosta, Abilene Christian
 Christiana Arteaga, Abilene Christian
 Michelle Mulrooney, Abilene Christian
 Carli Arthurs, Stephen F. Austin
 Sophie Fondren, Stephen F. Austin
 Madison Ledet, Lamar
 Sophia Manibo, Lamar
 Camille Bassett, Central Arkansas
 Lauren Mercuri, Central Arkansas

References

External links 
2018 Southland Conference Women's Soccer Championship

 
Southland Conference Women's Soccer Tournament